Emphasis! (On Parenthesis)  is an album by the Stanton Moore Trio, released on April 22, 2008. Organist Robert Walter and guitarist Will Bernard, both of whom played with Moore on his previous solo album, III, are featured on the album.

Notably, each track on the album features a title containing a parenthetical statement, as does the title of the album. This is Moore's response to the gentle ribbing of his Galactic bandmates that he includes brackets in almost every song he writes.

Personnel
 Stanton Moore: drums
 Robert Walter: Hammond B3 organ, piano, toy piano, clavinet
 Will Bernard: guitar

Track listing
 "(Late Night at the) Maple Leaf" - 6:27
 "(Proper) Gender" - 2:56
 "Wissions (of Vu)" - 3:22
 "(Sifting Through the) African Diaspora" - 5:10
 "Over (Compensatin')" - 4:37
 "(Smell My) Special Ingredients" - 5:39
 "(I Have) Super Strength" - 3:48
 "(Who Ate the) Layer Cake?" - 4:28
 "Thanks! (Again)" - 2:57
 "(Put On Your) Big People Shoes" - 4:08
 "(Here Come the) Brown Police" - 3:20

References

External links
 Stanton Moore official website

2008 albums
Stanton Moore albums